Jackson Kasari McCracken (born October 9, 1992) is an American soccer player who last played for Orange County Blues FC in the United Soccer League.

Career

Youth and college
McCracken played four years of college soccer at Loyola Marymount University.

While at college, McCracken spent time with USL PDL clubs Pali Blues and Portland Timbers U23s.

Professional
McCracken signed with USL side Orange County Blues on March 20, 2015.

References

1992 births
Living people
American soccer players
Loyola Marymount Lions men's soccer players
OC Pateadores Blues players
Portland Timbers U23s players
Orange County SC players
Association football defenders
USL Championship players
USL League Two players
Soccer players from California